Sabbatical: A Romance is a novel by the American writer John Barth, published in 1982. The story is centered on a yacht race through the Chesapeake Bay. Barth's narrative was inspired by the death of ex-CIA officer John Paisley.

References

External links 
 John Barth interview with Don Swaim, June 8, 1982

1982 American novels
American satirical novels
Novels by John Barth